James G. Day (1835-1898) was a justice of the Iowa Supreme Court from September 1, 1870, to December 31, 1883, appointed from Fremont County, Iowa.

References

External links

Justices of the Iowa Supreme Court
1835 births
1898 deaths
19th-century American judges